The German Patent and Trade Mark Office (abbreviation: DPMA) is the German national patent office, with headquarters in Munich, and offices in Berlin and Jena. In 2006 it employed 2556 people, of which about 700 were patent examiners.

Function and status

The DPMA is the central authority in the field of intellectual property protection in Germany. Its responsibilities include the granting of patents for the registration of industrial designs, trademarks and designs, as well as for informing the public about existing industrial property rights. Recognised partner of the DPMA is the Patentinformationszentrum (Patent Information Centre), united in the Deutscher Patentinformationszentren e.V (German Patent Information Centres Association).

The legal basis of the German Patent and Trademark Office is § 26 of the Patentgesetz (German Patents Act).

History
The first unified Patentgesetz (German Patent Act) was adopted on 25 May 1877, which mandated the establishment of an authority tasked with reviewing and awarding patents. On this basis, on 1 July 1877, the Kaiserliche Patentamt (Imperial Patent Office) was founded in Berlin.

The Chairman of the newly established office was Karl Rudolf Jacobi. The first German patent was granted on 1 July 1877 for a "method for producing a red ultramarine colour", invented by Johannes Zeltner. The first trademark registration was on 16 October 1894 for a Berlin lamp producer.

In 1905, the Patent Office moved into premised designed by the architects Solf and Wichards on the corner of Gitschiner Straße and Lindenstraße in Kreuzberg, with a characteristic 243-metre front on the elevated highway.

In 1919, the Patent Office was renamed the Reichspatentamt (State Patent Office).

The Nazi anti-Semitic and anti-foreigner laws strangled scientific output and patent applications. Almost as soon as they came into power, the Nazis moved to throw the Jews out of the German Patent Offices, with only a few exceptions for those who had served at the front during World War I or who had lost a parent or son in fighting. “Law Relating to the Admission to the Profession of Patent-agent and Lawyer of 22 April 1933. The Government of the Reich has resolved the following law which is promulgated herewith: Section 1. Patent-agents which are of non-Aryan descent pursuant to the law relating to the reestablishment of the Professional Civil Service of 7 April 1933 may be taken off the roster of patent-agents kept by the Reich Patent Office up to 30 September 1933…”

In 1938, the “Aryanization” of patents was mandated, in that new patents could only be proposed and submitted if sponsored by an Aryan and German citizens, and not by dissidents, foreigners or Jews. Existing patents held by Jews must also be turned over to a German citizen. As one author stated, “Jewish commercial firms and the associated property, as well as wholesale operations and industry that are Jewish because of the degree to which they are under Jewish ownership, can be de-Jewdified [sic]. Important patents and commercial secrets must be transferred to non-Jewish control.”

The Reich Patent Office came under Nazi political party pressure as well. One of Adolf Hitler’s chauffeurs, Anton Loibl, invented the idea of attaching small pieces of glass to the pedals of bicycles, that would reflect the lights of approaching cars. In 1936, word of this invention came to the SS, and they decided to form a partnership with Loibl to market his idea. However, the idea was not all that novel, and a similar safety device had already been applied for as a patent. “But this competitor lacked something very important- the SS as a business partner. His patent application was buried. Loibl’s sailed through, and in 1938 Heinrich Himmler used his supreme authority as head of the German police to pass a new traffic law. This required all German bicycles to be equipped with Loibl’s reflective pedal… in 1938 alone, the SS received a tidy 77,740 reichsmarks from the bicycle pedal proceeds.”

In the last months of the war, many of the technical records of the German Patent Office were widely dispersed throughout Germany to preserve them from the Allied firebombing of Berlin. “One set of copies of the pending 180,000 patent applications were taken into eastern Germany where they were later lost by fire. The technical library of 300,000 volumes and the records of the secret patents were moved to Heringen, near Kassel, and 3,000 valuable reference books were sent through Czechoslovakia to Bavaria. Part of the Trademark records were moved to another building in Berlin where they were lost also by fire. Some of the technical personnel remained at the Patent Office in Berlin, some went to Heringen and others were scattered throughout Germany. The Patent Office building in Berlin was about one-third destroyed by a heavy bombing attack on February 5, 1945. US and British representatives reached Heringen in May 1945 and found some 50 former patent employees at work restoring and re-classifying the patent indexes and examination material. The library and the register of secret patents were located in a potash mine in Heringen. However, the files of the secret applications and patents had been burned upon orders of the German government shortly before the arrival of the US troops… The technical library has been moved from the potash mine in Heringen and is again available to the public. The library is equipped with 12 miles of new metal shelves which provide space for about 500,000 volumes.”

Other attempts to preserve German patents was the re-registration of the patents in other countries. In 1945, it was noted that: “Patents Transferred. That Germany is preparing in other ways to salve what she can is indicated by reports that the flight of capital on a large scale is taking place from Germany to Sweden through the transfer of German patents. The Swedish Patent Office is said to be inundated with registrations of patents on behalf of German individuals, commercial corporations and research organizations. Last year, it is said, 60 per cent of the record total of 10,000 patent registrations were German and the proportion has increased this year. Among those who registered were I.G. Farben, the Steyr-Daimler-Benz automobile manufacturers, the Siemens and A.E.G. Combines. The patents, of course, represent substantial assets."

After the Second World War, the patent office property was seized by the Allied Control Council, including patents, trademarks, and emblems, under Articles II and X of the Allied Control Council Law No. 5, 30 October 1945. Article II of this Act on 31 August 1951 set aside all Allied Control Council Law but in fact this occurred only on 12 September 1990 with the "Treaty on the Final Settlement with Respect to Germany". Until 1951 the seized patents were used by the Allies technologically and economically.

On 1 October 1949, the Deutsches Patentamt (German Patent Office) moved to premises in the Deutsches Museum in Munich. In 1951 a branch office was opening in the old Reichspatentamt in Berlin. 1959, the Patent Office moved into its own building in Munich.

In 1990, the Office for Amt für Erfindungs- und Patentwesen der DDR (Inventions and Patent Office of the GDR) merged with the Patent Office.

In 1998, an office in Jena was built and the bulk of the Berlin office moved there. The Office has thus now has three locations, Munich, Jena and Berlin. In the same year was a renaming of Deutsche Patentamt to Deutsches Patent- und Markenamt (DPMA), in order to take the importance of brands as a working area of the office into account.

Originally appeals against decisions of the Office were conducted by the internally, however, since 1961 this is done in the Bundespatentgericht (Federal Patent Court).

Since 1978 and the entry into force of the European Patent Convention, the European Patent Office also issues patents effective in Germany, as part of a European patent's "bundle" of national patents.

Patent applicants

In 2006, the leaders in terms of numbers of patents at the DPMA were Siemens, with 2501 patents, Bosch, with 2202 patents, DaimlerChrysler with 1626 patents.

Inventors gallery

In 1984, the DPMA opened an "inventor's gallery", as "an incentive for all innovative forces to express themselves more, and a signal to the insurance companies to promote them long term." It was enlarged in 1987 and again in 1999 and now covers 17 German inventors:
Béla Barényi,
Gerd Binnig,
Ludwig Bölkow,
Walter Bruch,
Jürgen Dethloff,
Artur Fischer,
Rudolf Hell,
Heinz Lindenmeier,
Hermann Oberth,
Hans Joachim Pabst von Ohain,
Oskar-Erich Peter,
Hans-Jürgen Quadbeck-Seeger,
Ernst Ruska,
Hans Sauer,
Felix Wankel,
Ernst-Ludwig Winnacker,
Konrad Zuse

See also 
 Bundespatentgericht
 Gebrauchsmuster
 German Association for the Protection of Intellectual Property (GRUR e. V.)
 German patent law
 Ralf Sieckmann v Deutsches Patent und Markenamt

References

External links 
  Official page
  DPMA annual reports (German: Jahresberichte)

German patent law
Patent offices
German federal agencies
Organisations based in Munich
1877 establishments in Bavaria
Government agencies established in 1877